Institut de formation de Saint-Quentin-en-Yvelines (IFSQY) is a Muslim private junior and senior high school/high school and sixth-form college (collège and lycée) in Montigny-le-Bretonneux, Yvelines, France, in the Paris metropolitan area. It is within the Saint-Quentin-en-Yvelines new town.

 the head of the institution was Slimane Bousanna. It was established in a former taxation building.

 the school had about 100 students. The rector of the department of Yvelines refused to contract with the school.

References

External links
 Institut de formation de Saint-Quentin-en-Yvelines  (Archive)
 Magassa-Konaté, Maria. "L'équité réclamée pour un collège musulman des Yvelines ." Saphir News (Islamic news site). Thursday 15 May 2014. 

Lycées in Yvelines
Islamic schools in France